Alonzo Christopher Paige (July 31, 1797 — March 31, 1868) was an American lawyer, politician, and judge from New York.

Early life 
On July 31, 1797, Paige was born in Schaghticoke, Rensselaer County, New York. Paige's father was Rev. Winslow Paige. Paige's mother was Clarissa (nee Keyes) Paige.

Education 
In 1812, Paige graduated from Williams College. Paige was sent by his father to Montgomery County to study theology. After some time, Paige returned to Schenectady and studied law instead.

Career 
Paige was admitted to the bar in 1819.

Paige was a member of the New York State Assembly (Schenectady Co.) in 1827, 1828, 1829 and 1830. In 1828, he was appointed as Reporter of the New York Court of Chancery, and published 11 volumes of chancery cases until 1845.

Paige was a member of the New York State Senate (3rd D.) in 1837, and from 1839 to 1842, sitting in the 60th, 62nd, 63rd, 64th and 65th New York State Legislatures. He was a justice of the New York Supreme Court (4th D.) from 1847 to 1851, and from 1856 to 1857, and a delegate to the New York State Constitutional Convention of 1867–68.

To undertake real estate development on Hamilton Hill, where the original African Cemetery was located, Paige purchased land for an African Section at Vale Cemetery. He had the burials re-interred in Vale Cemetery at his expense. This protected the graves, as others had disturbed them on the hill in seeking sandy soil for cement making.

Personal life 
On July 11, 1832, Paige married Harriet Bowers Mumford. They had four children, Benjamin Mumford Paige (1834-1838, died at age 4), Clara Keyes Paige (1837-1894), Harriet Bowers Paige (1838-1895), and Edwards Winslow Paige (1844-1918).
On March 31, 1867, Paige's wife died in New York. 
On March 31, 1868, Paige died in Schenectady, New York. Paige was buried at the First Presbyterian Church Cemetery in Schenectady, New York.

See also 
 Vale Cemetery and Vale Park

References

Additional sources 
The New York Civil List compiled by Franklin Benjamin Hough (pages 131ff, 144, 206ff, 210, 295, 351 and 353; Weed, Parsons and Co., 1858)
The American Annual Cyclopedia and Register of Important Events of the Year 1868 (Appleton's, 1869; pg. 608)
History of the Reed Family in Europe and America by Jacob Whittemore Reed (Boston, 1861; pg. 120f)

External links

 Alonzo C. Paige at courts.state.ny.us
 Martin Van Buren to Alonzo Christopher Paige discussing slavery

1797 births
1868 deaths
Democratic Party New York (state) state senators
People from Schaghticoke, New York
Politicians from Schenectady, New York
Democratic Party members of the New York State Assembly
Williams College alumni
New York Supreme Court Justices
19th-century American politicians
19th-century American judges